This is a list of aviation-related events from 1935:

Events 
 Employing aerial refueling, a sustained flight record of 653 hours 33 minutes (27 days, 5 hours, 33 minutes) is set. It remains unbroken.
 Consolidated Aircraft Corporation moves from Buffalo, New York, to San Diego, California.
 Imperial Japanese Navy dive bombers practice against a full-size mock-up of the United States Navy aircraft carrier Saratoga (CV-3) at the Kashima bombing range.
 Pan American World Airways builds a seaplane base for its transpacific China Clipper flying boats on Sand Island at Midway Atoll.
 The Soviet Union has the largest bomber force in the world.
 The Kalinin K-7 programme ends with the construction of only one K-7, which had been lost in 1933. The end of the programme brings the cancellation of the construction of two additional K-7s.
 The United States Army places a rotary-wing aircraft in service for the first time when it purchases a Kellet KD-1 autogiro for evaluation. The autogiro is designated the YG-1 in U.S. Army service.

January
 Helen Richey begins flying as a first officer for Pennsylvania Central Airlines. Operating a Ford Tri-Motor between Washington, D.C. and Detroit, Michigan, via Pittsburgh, Pennsylvania, and Cleveland, Ohio, she is the first female pilot for a regularly scheduled commercial airline.
 January 11–12 – Amelia Earhart makes the first solo flight from Hawaii to North America, flying from Honolulu to Oakland, California. It is also the first solo flight across any portion of the Pacific Ocean.
 January 15 – United States Army Air Corps Major James Doolittle establishes a record for a transport flight across the United States, from Los Angeles to Newark, New Jersey in 11 hours 59 minutes.
 January 26 – During a mail flight, the Hillman's Airways de Havilland Dragon Rapide G-ACPO crashes in bad weather at Derbyhaven on the Isle of Man.
 January 31 – During a scheduled passenger flight from Moscow in the Soviet Union to Berlin, Germany, the Deruluft Junkers Ju 52/3mge D-AREN crashes into a hill in fog and rain, killing all 11 people on board.

February
 February 3 – The German aircraft designer Hugo Junkers dies
 February 12 – The U.S. Navy airship  crashes and sinks off Point Sur, California. Two of her crewmen die.
 February 21 – Sisters Jane and Elizabeth Du Bois, daughters of the American consul at Naples, Italy, Coert du Bois, force open the door of a Hillman Airways de Havilland Dragon Rapide airliner in flight and jump to their deaths. Both women had been engaged to be married to pilots killed in the crash of a Royal Air Force flying boat off Sicily on February 15.
 February 22
It becomes illegal for airplanes to fly over the White House in Washington, D.C. President Franklin D. Roosevelts complaint that aircraft disturb his sleep prompts the new law.
Leland Andrews breaks Doolittle's January record, completing a transcontinental transport flight across the United States in 11 hours 34 minutes.
 February 26
 In Germany, Adolf Hitler orders Hermann Göring to secretly establish the Luftwaffe, violating the provision of the Treaty of Versailles of 1919 that Germany never again possess armed aircraft.
 Robert Watson-Watt and Arnold Wilkins first demonstrate the reflection of radio waves from an aircraft, near Daventry in England; on June 17, the first radio detection of an aircraft by ground-based radar is made at Orford Ness.

March
 March 1 – The United States Department of War establishes General Headquarters Air Force within the United States Army.
 March 9 – The Nazi Government in Germany publicly announces the formation of the Luftwaffe in defiance of the 1919 Treaty of Versailles. Hermann Göring is made its commander-in-chief, a position he holds almost until the end of World War II in 1945.
 March 28 – Robert Goddard launches the world's first successful liquid-fuelled rocket.

April
 April 1 - Swissair begins services between Zürich and London.
 April 4 – United Airways Ltd is formed to operate services between England and the Isle of Man.
 April 13 - Qantas and Imperial Airways provide regular connecting flights between Brisbane, Australia, and London
 April 16–17 - A Pan American World Airways Sikorsky S-42 makes the first airline survey flight from California to Hawaii, departing from San Francisco and arriving at Pearl Harbor. It is the beginning of the development of an orderly commercial air transportation system in the Pacific Ocean.

May
 May 6
 Flying a scheduled passenger flight from Albuquerque Municipal Airport in Albuquerque, New Mexico, to Kansas City, Missouri, the Transcontinental & Western Air Douglas DC-2-112 NC13785 crashes near Atlanta, Missouri, killing five of the eight people on board.. United States Senator Bronson M. Cutting of New Mexico is among the dead. Controversy over conflicting findings by the Bureau of Air Commerce and by a U.S. Senate committee regarding the cause of the crash will lead to the establishment in the United States of an independent air safety board under the Civil Aeronautics Act of 1938.
 Frank Hawks arrives at Los Angeles, California, completing a 39-hour 52-minute flight from Buenos Aires, Argentina, to demonstrate the long-range capabilities of the Northrop Gamma 2E attack aircraft to the Argentine Navy, making eight rest and refueling stops along the way. Taking off from Buenos Aires on May 3 with Northrop chief test pilot Gage H. Irving in the plane's gunner's seat, Hawks has broken ten intercity speed records during the 8,090-mile (13,020-km) trip, including on the 3,430-mile (5,523-km) leg from Cristóbal, Panama, to Los Angeles, which he covers in a record-breaking 17 hours 50 minutes.
 May 18 – A Polikarpov I-5 fighter collides with the Tupolev ANT-20 Maxim Gorky while trying to conduct a loop around Maxim Gorky during a demonstration flight over Moscow. Maxim Gorky crashes near Tushino. Fifty-six people die, making it the worst heavier-than-air crash and second-worst air crash in history at the time, exceeded only by the death toll of 73 in the April 1933 crash of the U.S. Navy dirigible .
 May 31 – Hickam Field is dedicated in the Territory of Hawaii.

June
 June 24 – One Ford Trimotor of Servicio Aéreo Colombiano (SACO) collides with another Ford Trimotor of Sociedad Colombo Alemana de Transporte Aéreo (SCADTA) in Medellín, Colombia. Fifteen people are killed, including the world-famous tango singer Carlos Gardel, the journalist, dramatist, and lyricist Alfredo Le Pera, and other musicians traveling with them to promote the new movie El día que me quieras ("The Day That You Will Love Me").
 June 25 – United States Coast Guard Lieutenant Richard L. Burke sets a world seaplane speed record carrying a  load over a  course at an average speed of  flying a Grumman JF-2 Duck.
 June 26 – Soviet military balloon pilots Christian Zille and Yury Prilutsky and Professor Alexander Verigo attempt to set a new altitude record for human flight in the balloon USSR-1 Bis. The Soviet government will award all three crew members the Order of Lenin for the flight.
 June 27 – United States Coast Guard Lieutenant Richard L. Burke sets a world seaplane altitude record of  carrying a  load, flying a Grumman JF-2 Duck.

July
 July 1 - The American flying team The Flying Keys sets an endurance record by flying a Curtiss Robin non-stop for 653 hours, 34 minutes in the vicinity of Meridian, Mississippi. During the flight, which began on June 4, the Robin's two-man crew receives fuel, other supplies, and fuel in mid-air from a similar aircraft.
 July 10 - The Bell Aircraft Corporation is founded in Buffalo, New York.
 July 13 - The Shoreham Airport terminal building is opened at Lancing, England.

August
 Because of deteriorating relations between Italy and Ethiopia, the British aircraft carriers HMS Courageous and HMS Glorious disembark their aircraft at Alexandria, Egypt, to guard against any outbreak of war spreading to British-controlled territory. The aircraft remain ashore in Egypt until early 1936.
 August 5 – French aviator Marcel Cagnot takes off in the Farman F.1001 in an attempt to set a new world altitude record.
 August 15 – Wiley Post, the first pilot to fly solo around the world, and his passenger, the humorist Will Rogers, are killed in the crash of a hybrid Lockheed Orion/Lockheed Explorer aircraft near Point Barrow in the Territory of Alaska.

September
 September 15 – A Seversky SEV-3 sets a world speed record for piston-engined amphibious airplanes, reaching . The record still stands.
 September 17 – Professional baseball player Len Koenecke of the Brooklyn Dodgers becomes so drunk on a flight to New York City that he is shackled to his seat and removed from the airliner in Detroit, Michigan. After sleeping in an airport chair there, he charters a plane to take him to Buffalo, New York. While the plane flies over Canada, Koenecke has a disagreement with the pilot and another passenger and attempts to seize control of the plane. To avoid a crash, the pilot and other passenger hit him over the head with a fire extinguisher, and he dies of a cerebral hemorrhage.>
 September 27 – The three obsolete biplanes that constitute the entire serviceable strength of the Ethiopian Air Force conduct a flypast as part of a military procession at Addis Ababa for the Emperor of Ethiopia, Haile Selassie I, who is trying to prepare Ethiopia for war with Italy.
 September 30 – Hillman's Airways, Spartan Air Lines, and United Airways Limited merge to form Allied British Airways, Ltd. The new airline will begin flight operations on January 1, 1936.

October
 Helen Richey, the first female pilot for a regularly scheduled airline, resigns her position as a first officer at Pennsylvania Central Airlines after 10 months. She had found the experience demeaning: she had received few opportunities to fly; male pilots ignored her or made her uncomfortable in the cockpit, had threatened to strike, and had voted to deny her membership in the Air Lines Pilot Association; and the Bureau of Air Commerce had ordered her grounded in bad weather and had backed the pilots unions request that the airline limit her to three flights per month.
 October 1 – The first company to bear the name British Airways Ltd is formed, by the merger of Hillman's Airways, Spartan Air Lines and United Airways Ltd.
 October 3 – Italy invades Ethiopia from its colony in Eritrea, beginning the Second Italo-Abyssinian War. The Italian expeditionary force has 150 aircraft – including Savoia-Marchetti SM.81, Caproni Ca.113, and Caproni Ca.133 bombers, Savoia-Marchetti S.55 flying boats, and IMAM R.37bis strategic reconnaissance planes – while the serviceable portion of the Imperial Ethiopian Air Force consists only of three small, obsolete biplanes.
 October 5 – Italian aircraft conduct a destructive and bloody bombing of Adowa, Ethiopia, after Ethiopian forces had withdrawn from it. The village had been the site of a disastrous defeat of Italian troops by Ethiopian forces in the Battle of Adowa in 1896.
 October 7 – United Airlines Trip 4, a Boeing 247D, crashes east of Silver Crown, Wyoming, killing all 12 people on board.
 October 29 – Allied British Airways Ltd is renamed British Airways Ltd. It will begin flight operations on January 1, 1936.
 October 30
 The Boeing Model 299, prototype of the Boeing B-17 Flying Fortress, crashes at Wright Field, Ohio, because of its gust locks remaining engaged on takeoff, killing Boeing test pilot Leslie Tower and United States Army Air Corps test pilot Ployer Peter Hill.
 A United Airlines Boeing Model 247D airliner on an instrument check flight with no passengers on board crashes near Cheyenne, Wyoming, killing the entire crew of four.

November
 November 8 – Sir Charles Kingsford Smith and his copilot Tommy Pethybridge in the Lockheed Altair Lady Southern Cross disappear over the Andaman Sea off the coast of Burma near Aye Island during an attempt to set an England-to-Australia speed record, never to be seen again.
 November 11 – A. W. Stevens and O. A. Anderson set a new balloon altitude record of 
 November 11–13 – Jean Batten becomes the first woman to fly solo across the South Atlantic, taking 2 days 13 hours from England to cross from Senegal to Brazil in a Percival Gull. She also breaks the speed record for this crossing, by a full day.
 November 22 – Pan American Airways commences both the first regular transpacific air service to Hawaii and the first transpacific airmail service, flying the Martin M-130 flying boat China Clipper from Alameda, California, to Manila, via Honolulu, Midway Atoll, Wake Island, and Guam. The aircraft carries more than 100,000 pieces of mail.

December
 To mark the 300th anniversary of French rule in the Americas, the Latécoère 521 flying boat Lieutenant de Vaisseau Paris makes a demonstration flight from France to Dakar, Senegal, then across the South Atlantic Ocean to Natal, Brazil, then to the French West Indies. It then flies on to Pensacola, Florida, where it suffers damage in a storm. It later is repaired and returns to service.
 A United States Marine Corps Grumman JF-2 Duck sets an unofficial world speed record for single-engine amphibian aircraft, reaching r).
 December 6 – Transcontinental and Western Air's first flight attendants – known at the time as "air hostesses" – begin flying, serving passengers aboard the airline's Douglas DC-2 aircraft.
 December 10 – A Sabena Savoia-Marchetti S.73 crashes into a hillside at Tatsfield, Surrey, in the United Kingdom, killing all 11 people on board. Among the dead is English tank and vehicle designer Sir John Carden.
 December 26 – General Rodolfo Graziani requests permission from Benito Mussolini to use poison gas against Ethiopian forces. He receives it, and during the last few days of December Italian aircraft begin dropping mustard gas on Ethiopian troops around the Takkaze River and on the village of Jijiga. Italian planes will drop poison gas for the remainder of the war, and continue to use it against Ethiopian guerrillas after the war ends.
 December 27 – U.S. Army Air Corps bombers from Wheeler Field bomb lava tubes to divert a flow of lava from Mauna Loa that is threatening Hilo, Hawaii. Bombing by U.S. Navy amphibious aircraft diverts lava away from Hilos waterworks.
 December 31 – The Imperial Airways Short S.8 Calcutta flying boat City of Khartoum (registration G-AASJ) suffers a catastrophic failure of all three engines shortly before the end of its flight between Crete and Alexandria, Egypt, just after nightfall and makes a forced landing on the Mediterranean Sea. The pilot is the only survivor; all nine passengers and the other three crew members die on impact or drown when the aircraft is overwhelmed by high seas and sinks.

First flights 
 Arado Ar 81
 Avro 636
 Bellanca 31-40 Senior Pacemaker
 Focke-Wulf Fw 58
 Focke-Wulf Fw 159
 Grigorovich E-2 (also known as Grigorovich DG-55)
 Grigorovich IP-1
 Henschel Hs 122
 Miles M.2 Hawk Trainer
 Miles M.5 Sparrowhawk
 Miles M.6 Hawcon
 Northrop 3A
 Piaggio P.23M
 Potez 452
 Potez 60
 Spring 1935
Arado Ar 80
Henschel Hs 123
 Summer 1935 – Ilyushin TsKB-26
 Autumn 1935 – Hafner A.R.III Gyroplane
 Late 1935 – Yokosuka B4Y (Allied reporting name "Jean")

January
 ANF Les Mureaux 117R.2
 Polikarpov R-Z
 January 5 – Tachikawa Ki-9 (Allied reporting name "Spruce")
 January 7 – Avro 652
 January 10 – Latécoère 521
 January 18 – Blohm & Voss Ha 137
 January 28 – Potez 62

February
 Watanabe E9W (Allied reporting name "Slim"), first Japanese aircraft designed specifically for operation from a submarine
 February 4 – Mitsubishi A5M (Allied reporting name "Claude")
 February 5 – Westland CL.20
 February 21 – Rolls-Royce PV-12 aero engine, prototype of the Rolls-Royce Merlin (in a Hawker Hart)
 February 24 – Heinkel He 111

March
 Kawasaki Ki-10 (Allied reporting name "Perry")
 March 6 – ANF Les Mureaux 115R.2
 March 15 – Dornier Do 18
 March 20 – Grumman XF3F-1, prototype of the Grumman F3F
 March 24 – Avro Anson military prototype K4771
 March 28 – Kassel 12A

April
 Douglas DB-1, prototype of the B-18 Bolo
 Martin-Baker MB 1
 April 1 – The NA-16 prototype of the T-6 Texan/Harvard
 April 5 – Fairchild 91
 April 12 – Bristol Type 142, the Britain First, prototype of the Bristol Blenheim

May
 May 15 – Curtiss Model 75, prototype of the P-36 Hawk
 May 11 – Miles M.4 Merlin prototype U-8, later G-ADFE
 May 19 – Consolidated XPBY-1, prototype of the PBY Catalina
 May 29 – Messerschmitt Bf 109 V1 D-IABI
 May 31 – Fairchild Model 45

June
 Cessna C-34 Airmaster
 June 4 - Armstrong Whitworth AW.23 K3585
 June 19 - Vickers Wellesley
 June 23 - Bristol Bombay K3583
 June 25 - Grumman J2F-1, first version of the Grumman J2F Duck
 June 25 – Farman F.1000

July
 Mitsubishi Ka-15, prototype of the Mitsubishi G3M (Allied reporting name "Nell")
 Tachikawa Ki-17 (Allied reporting name "Cedar")
 July 6 – Fairchild 82
 July 11 – Yakovlev AIR-19, prototype of the Yakovlev UT-2
 July 17 – Boeing Model 299 (US civil "eXperimental" registration NX13372), prototype of the B-17 Flying Fortress
 July 25 – Latécoère 582
 July 27 – Miles Falcon Six

August
 August 8 – Morane-Saulnier MS.405
 August 12 – De Havilland Dragonfly
 August 15 – Seversky SEV-1XP, prototype of the Seversky P-35
 August 19
CANT Z.506
Northrop XBT-1, prototype of the Northrop BT
 August 21 - Bücker Bü 133 Jungmeister

September
 Heinkel He 112
 September 17 - Junkers Ju 87

November
 November 6 - Hawker Hurricane K5083

December
 December 17 – Douglas DST, prototype of the Douglas DC-3
 December 18 – Miles M.7 Nighthawk
 December 31 – Avro Anson Mark I, first production version of the Anson

Entered service 
 Aeronca L
 Beriev MBR-2 with Soviet Naval Aviation
 Breguet 521 Bizerte with French Naval Aviation
 Junkers Ju 160 with Deutsche Luft Hansa
 Levasseur PL.101 with French Naval Aviation aboard the aircraft carrier Béarn
 Nakajima Ki-4 with the Imperial Japanese Army Air Force
 Polikarpov R-Z with the Soviet Air Force

January
 January 28 – Grumman F2F with United States Navy Fighter Squadron 2 (VF-2B) aboard  and Fighter Squadron 3 (VF-3B) aboard

March
 March 11 – Avro 652 with Imperial Airways

August
 Avro 636 with the Irish Air Corps

October
 Nakajima E8N (Allied reporting name "Dave") with the Imperial Japanese Navy

November
 Hawker Hind

Retirements
Westland Interceptor

October
 Handley Page Hinaidi by the Royal Air Force

References 

 
 
  

 
Aviation by year